Land of Clover, also known as the Lathrop Brown Estate, is a national historic district located at Nissequogue in Suffolk County, New York.  The district encompasses an estate with six contributing buildings and one contributing structure.  The estate house is a large two-story brick Georgian Revival structure built between 1912 and 1918. It is loosely patterned after Westover Plantation. Also on the property are a contributing horseshoe stable, superintendent's cottage, ice house and garage, U-shaped barn, small barn and a water tower.  It is now a boarding school known as The Knox School. The Estate house is currently known as Houghton Hall.
It was added to the National Register of Historic Places in 1993.

References

External links
The Knox School (Official Site)
Land of Clover (Old Long Island)

Houses on the National Register of Historic Places in New York (state)
Houses completed in 1918
Historic districts in Suffolk County, New York
Historic districts on the National Register of Historic Places in New York (state)
National Register of Historic Places in Suffolk County, New York